The Standing Bureau of the Chamber of Deputies consists of the President of the Chamber of Deputies, four vice-presidents, four secretaries, and four quaestors. The President of the Standing Bureau also serves as the President of the Chamber of Deputies. The President is elected, by secret ballot, for the duration of the legislative period. All the other members are elected at the beginning of each parliamentary session.

The functions are distributed through the political groups respecting the proportions of the political composition of the Chamber.

At the moment both Chambers of Parliament are constituted (the seats are validated, the Standing Bureau is elected, the political groups elect their Bureaus). Until the procedures are completed, the session is conducted by the eldest Deputy (as President), aided by the two youngest Deputies (as Secretaries).

Members 

Last election of the leadership of the Chamber president: November 2021

Political Groups Leaders 

Although the leaders of the political groups are not members of the Standing Bureau, they have a key part in the leadership of the Chamber.

References 

Chamber of Deputies (Romania)
Presiding bodies of legislatures